The halogens are a series of chemical elements.

Halogen may also refer to:
Halogen (album), by Whitehouse
Halogen (band), an Australian musical group
Halogen lamp, a type of incandescent light bulb
Halogen oven, a type of cooker utilising halogen bulbs
Halogen Communications, a UK communications consultancy
Halogen Foundation, a not-for-profit in Singapore
Halogen Software, a Canadian company that provides cloud-based talent management solutions
Halogen TV, a US cable network